

225001–225100 

|-id=033
| 225033 Maskoliunas ||  || Marius Maskoliunas (born 1972), a Lithuanian astronomer and discoverer of minor planets, known for his work on stellar photometry, galactic structure and gravitational microlensing. || 
|-id=076
|  225076 Vallemare ||  || The Italian village of Vallemare, Lazio, where the Vallemare di Borbona Observatory  of the discoverer Vincenzo Silvano Casulli is located || 
|-id=088
|  225088 Gonggong ||  || Gonggong, from Chinese mythology is a water god with red hair and a serpent-like tail. He is known for creating chaos, causing flooding, and tilting the Earth; he is often depicted with the head of a human and the body of a snake. Gonggong is often attended by his minister, Xiangliu, a nine-headed poisonous snake monster for whom the satellite is named. || 
|}

225101–225200 

|-bgcolor=#f2f2f2
| colspan=4 align=center | 
|}

225201–225300 

|-id=225
|  225225 Ninagrunewald ||  || Nina Grünewald (born 2001), granddaughter of German discoverer Rolf Apitzsch || 
|-id=232
|  225232 Kircheva ||  || Krassymira Kircheva (born 1970), a Bulgarian engineer who contributed to the acquisition of astrometric observations in Bulgaria || 
|-id=238
|  225238 Hristobotev ||  || Hristo Botev (1848–1876), a Bulgarian poet and national revolutionary || 
|-id=239
|  225239 Ruthproell ||  || Elsa Anna Ruth Proell (born 1923), the mother-in-law of German discoverer Rolf Apitzsch || 
|-id=250
|  225250 Georgfranziska ||  || Georg (1835–1902) and Franziska Speyer (1844–1909), founders of the "Georg und Franziska Speyer'sche Hochschulstiftung", and members of the Speyer family, a prominent Jewish family of German descent || 
|-id=254
|  225254 Flury ||  || Walter Flury (born 1943), a pioneer in space debris research and a recognized expert in celestial mechanics. || 
|-id=276
|  225276 Leïtos || 1436 T-2 || Leïtos, from Greek mythology. He was the son of Alektryon, leader of the Boeotians, and was wounded by Hektor in the Trojan War. || 
|-id=277
|  225277 Stino ||  || "Stinknormal" (SN), the German word for "boringly normal", inspired by the letters "SN" in the provisional designation of this ordinary main-belt asteroid || 
|}

225301–225400 

|-id=321
| 225321 Stevenkoenig ||  || Steven Koenig (born 1985), an American amateur astronomer and developer of optical innovations in astrophototography. He is the son of Dean Koenig (see ) who has been restoring and repairing telescopes. || 
|}

225401–225500 

|-bgcolor=#f2f2f2
| colspan=4 align=center | 
|}

225501–225600 

|-bgcolor=#f2f2f2
| colspan=4 align=center | 
|}

225601–225700 

|-bgcolor=#f2f2f2
| colspan=4 align=center | 
|}

225701–225800 

|-id=711
| 225711 Danyzy ||  ||  (1698–1777), an astronomer, mathematician and hydrographer, member of the Montpellier Royal Society of Sciences, and responsible for the construction of the Montpellier  Observatory  || 
|}

225801–225900 

|-bgcolor=#f2f2f2
| colspan=4 align=center | 
|}

225901–226000 

|-bgcolor=#f2f2f2
| colspan=4 align=center | 
|}

References 

225001-226000